Envy of None (abbreviated as EON) is a Canadian-American rock supergroup formed in 2021 by former Rush guitarist Alex Lifeson, along with bassist Andy Curran, vocalist Maiah Wynne, and guitarist and keyboardist Alfio Annibalini. Their self-titled studio album was released on April 8, 2022.

History 
In June 2021, Lifeson released two new solo instrumental tracks, "Kabul Blues" and "Spy House", on his official website. The new music coincided with the release of the Alex Lifeson Les Paul Standard Axcess model of electric guitar produced by Epiphone, and feature Canadian musicians Andy Curran of rock band Coney Hatch on bass and David Quinton Steinberg on drums. Less than a week following the announcement, Lifeson revealed that he had completed 10 songs for his new side project Envy of None, featuring Curran, Alfio Annibalini on guitar, and Maiah Wynne on vocals, with additional contributions from Steinberg and Tim Oxford on drums. The project originated when Curran and Wynne were working on new music, which caught Lifeson's attention and asked to hear the material. Curran encouraged Lifeson to contribute guitar parts if something interested him, and said: "He played on one track and one became two, and two became three".

The band had hoped to have the music finished for an album release in late 2021, but it was delayed until 2022. On January 12, 2022, the group announced that their self-titled debut studio album would be released on April 8 via Kscope. Their first single, "Liar", was released on the same day. On March 2, 2022, the band released a second single, "Look Inside", and a music video for the new song on March 9, 2022.

The band's first studio album is the eponymous Envy of None consisting of 11 tracks. It was recorded during the COVID-19 pandemic, and was released on April 8, 2022 by Kscope, an independent record label based in London. It has been described as having elements of both ambient and industrial music. The last song of the album, the instrumental Western Sunset, is a tribute to Lifeson's former Rush bandmate, drummer and lyricist Neil Peart. Lifeson composed the song at Peart's Santa Monica home shortly before the drummer's death in January 2020.

In 2022, Envy of None released a single to support UNHCR after the Russian invasion of Ukraine. The band raised close to $100,000 through this effort.

Lifeson has stated he does not intend to participate in concert tours, but will "do a few shows here and there".

Band members
Alfio Annibalini – guitar, keyboards, programming
Andy Curran – bass, programming, guitar, stylophone, backing vocals
Alex Lifeson – guitar, mandola, banjo, programming
Maiah Wynne – lead vocals, keyboards

Discography

Studio albums

Envy of None (2022)

Track listing 
All tracks are written, arranged, recorded and produced by Envy of None.

Personnel 
Envy of None:
 Andy Curran – bass guitar, synth bass, programming, guitar, backing vocals, stylophone
 Alf Annibalini – guitar, keyboards, programming, mixing
 Alex Lifeson – guitar, mandola, programming, mixing
 Maiah Wynne – lead and backing vocals, keyboards

Additional musicians:
 Dreadlight and Heidi DuBose – additional backing vocals
 Bethany Joyce – cello (2)
 David Quinton Steinberg – drums (all but 1, 2, 6)
 Joe Vitale – drums (6), additional recording
 Tim Oxford – drums (1)
 Jonathan Dinklage – strings (violin/viola) (11)

Production 
 Beech – package design
 Aliephant – additional vocal production, additional backing vocals
 Anton Evans, Jason "Metal" Donkersgoed, Roman Marcone, Spencer Sunshine – additional recording

Singles and EPs 
"Liar" (2022)
"Look Inside" (2022)
"Enemy"/"You'll Be Sorry" (2022) - special limited blue and yellow colored vinyl to raise money to support Ukraine

References

Canadian rock music groups
American rock music groups
Musical groups from Los Angeles
Musical groups established in 2021
2021 establishments in Canada